1980–81 was the 34th season of the Western International Hockey League.

Standings

 Cranbrook Royals	40		24	12	 4				239	192		 52
 Kimberley Dynamiters	40		21	16	 3				207	199		 45
 Trail Smoke Eaters	40		22	18	 0				217	202		 44
 Nelson Maple Leafs 	40		16	22	 2				161	197		 34
 Elk Valley Blazers	40		12	27	 1				178	238		 25

Playoffs

Semi finals

Best of 7

 Cranbrook Royals defeated Nelson Maple Leafs 4 games to 1 (5-8, 6-3, 4-3 OT, 7-6 OT, C-N)
 Kimberley Dynamiters defeated Trail Smoke Eaters 4 games to 2 (9-7, 5-4, 10-3, 4-2, 3-8, 7-5)

Final

In the "best of 7" final, Kimberley Dynamiters defeated Cranbrook Royals 4 games to 2 (7-3, 7-4, 7-3, 4-11, 5-11, 3-1) to advance to the 1980-81 British Columbia Senior Playoffs.

References 

Western International Hockey League seasons
WIHL